Michael Gruber (born October 1, 1940) is an American author.  

Gruber was born in Brooklyn and currently lives in Seattle, Washington. He attended Columbia University and received his Ph.D. in biology from the University of Miami. He worked as a cook, a marine biologist, a speech writer, a policy advisor for the Jimmy Carter White House, and a bureaucrat for the United States Environmental Protection Agency (EPA) before becoming a novelist. 

Gruber was the ghostwriter of the popular Robert K. Tanenbaum series of Butch Karp novels starting with No Lesser Plea and ending with Resolved. After the partnership with Tanenbaum ended, Gruber began publishing novels using his own name. The Book of Air and Shadows became a national bestseller shortly after its release in March 2007.

Published works
Tropic of Night - The detective Jimmy Paz investigates a series of mysteries involving African sorcery in Miami.  Themes explored include the nature of race, "magic," and the perceived illusions of reality. (2003)
Valley of Bones - Jimmy Paz becomes intertwined with the life of a nun (Emmylou Dideroff) from a little-known Catholic order who is wrapped up in the Sudanese civil war.  Themes include redemption and the mysteries of faith.  (2005)
Night of the Jaguar - Paz investigates a string of murders revolving around an Indian shaman from the Amazon rain forest and a guardian jaguar spirit.  Environmental devastation, greed, and the failures of science to explain the unknown are some of the areas explored in the last novel of the Paz trilogy.  (2006)
The Witch's Boy - Classical stories are revisited in this fantasy novel, as seen through the eyes of an ugly orphaned boy named Lump who is raised by a witch.  Winner of the 2006 Scandiuzzi Children's Book Award for Middle Grades/Young Adults of the Washington State Book Awards.
The Book of Air and Shadows - Letters found in a rare book set off a race to find an undiscovered Shakespeare play.  The concept of "intellectual property" and the world of William Shakespeare are explored in this intricate thriller. (2007)
Forgery of Venus - A novel about art forgery and time travel.(2008)
The Good Son - A spy thriller that slides in and out of conventional identities with great facility. (2010)
 The Return (2013) - Aging Vietnam vet Marder ventures to Mexico with Skelly, a war buddy and elite soldier with ties to the underworld, in order to seek revenge for the murders that drove his wife to suicide.

Ghost-written works for Robert K. Tanenbaum
1987  No Lesser Plea
1989  Depraved Indifference 
1991  Immoral Certainty   
1992  Reversible Error   
1993  Material Witness   
1994  Corruption of Blood  
1994  Justice Denied   
1996  Falsely Accused   
1997  Irresistible Impulse   
1998  Reckless Endangerment  
1999  Act of Revenge   
2000  True Justice  
2001  Enemy Within  
2002  Absolute Rage
2003  Resolved

References

External links
 Official website
Neurobotics article appearing in Wired Magazine
Map the Genome, Hack the Genome. article appearing in Wired Magazine
Interview with author at BookBrowse
"The case of the missing ghost" by Jules Older, San Francisco Magazine
"Story behind The Return", online essay by Gruber at Upcoming4.me

Columbia University alumni
1940 births
Living people
People from Brooklyn
Writers from Seattle
Ghostwriters
American male novelists